Procas or Proca (said to have reigned 817-794 BC) was one of the Latin kings of Alba Longa in the mythic tradition of the founding of Rome. He was the father of Amulius and Numitor and the great-grandfather of Romulus and Remus, Rome's legendary founders.

The name

The names of the Alban kings are often related to toponyms around Rome, or to legendary figures in the early history of Rome. The constructed genealogies in which they appear may reflect the desire of status-seeking families in the Late Republic to lay claim to Trojan ancestry. The name Procas or Proca may be related to the mythological figure Prochyte, a kinswoman of Aeneas who died when the fleet carrying the refugees of Troy to Italy was within sight of the coast. She was buried on the island that bore her name.

Family tree

References

Kings of Alba Longa
Characters in Book VI of the Aeneid